Kharbadi is a village in Motala taluka, Buldhana district, Maharashtra, India. It is 3 km away from Motala.

Villages in Buldhana district